Nyombi is a surname. Notable people with the surname include: 

Peter Nyombi (1954–2018), Ugandan lawyer and politician
Thembo Nyombi (born 1964), Ugandan economist and politician

Surnames of African origin